Ebdon is a surname. It originated as a toponymic surname, referring either to Ebdon Farm in Sidbury or Ebdon in Wick St. Lawrence, both in England. People with this surname include:

Dick Ebdon (1913–1987), English football forward
Edward Ebdon (1870–1950), English cricketer
John Ebdon (1923–2005), British author and broadcaster
John Ebdon (cricketer) (1876–1952), English cricketer
Les Ebdon (born 1947), British chemist and academic administrator
Marcus Ebdon (born 1970), Welsh football manager and former midfielder
Percy Ebdon (1874–1943), English rugby player and cricketer
Peter Ebdon (born 1970),  English snooker player
Thomas Ebdon (1738–1811), British composer and organist

References

English toponymic surnames